Hornhausen is a village and a former municipality in the Börde district in Saxony-Anhalt, Germany. Since 1 July 2009, it is part of the town Oschersleben.

Former municipalities in Saxony-Anhalt
Oschersleben